Alan Thomas Daniel Power (born 23 January 1988) is an Irish footballer who plays for Kilmarnock as a midfielder. He has previously played for Grays Athletic, Hartlepool United, Rushden & Diamonds, Lincoln City and Kilmarnock.

Club career
Born in Dublin, Power started his career with Nottingham Forest. Manager Colin Calderwood's named him as a substitute in several first team matches towards the end of the 2006–07 season. Power made his first full start against Peterborough United in the Football League Trophy on 4 September 2007.

Power signed for Grays Athletic on a three-month loan deal on 22 November 2007, he returned to Forest having played in five Conference National games and three FA Trophy games, scoring once. He was recalled by Forest in February 2008.

In June 2008, Power signed for League One outfit Hartlepool United and he made his league debut coming on as a substitute in the home defeat to Stockport County on 23 August 2008.

In June 2010 it was announced he would join Rushden & Diamonds on 1 July 2010 following the expiry of his Hartlepool contract. He was released by Rushden in May 2011.

Lincoln City
On 6 July 2011, Power signed a one-year contract with Lincoln City. On 24 May 2013, Power signed a new two-year contract with the club. Power was also named as club captain. On 21 May 2015 he agreed a new two-year contract at Lincoln City keeping him at Sincil Bank until the 2016–17 season. Power left at the end of the 2016–17 season, being widely considered as a club legend by Lincoln fans due to his unwavering passion and loyalty.

Kilmarnock
On 24 June 2017, Power signed for Kilmarnock on a two-year contract.

St Mirren 
On 21 June 2021, Power signed for St Mirren.

Kilmarnock (2nd stint) 
In May 2022, Power returned to a newly promoted Kilmarnock side on a season-long deal.

International career
He has represented the Republic of Ireland at youth international level and was called into the Irish Under-21 squad in October 2007.

Career statistics

References

External links

Republic of Ireland profile at Soccerscene

Living people
1988 births
Association footballers from Dublin (city)
Republic of Ireland association footballers
Republic of Ireland under-21 international footballers
Belvedere F.C. players
Association football midfielders
Nottingham Forest F.C. players
Grays Athletic F.C. players
Hartlepool United F.C. players
Rushden & Diamonds F.C. players
Lincoln City F.C. players
English Football League players
National League (English football) players
Kilmarnock F.C. players
Scottish Professional Football League players
St Mirren F.C. players